The Anaheim Union High School District (AUHSD) is a public school district serving portions of the Orange County cities of Anaheim, Buena Park, Cypress, La Palma, and Stanton. It oversees eight junior high schools (7-8), eight high schools (9-12), and one non-magnet, secondary selective school, Oxford Academy (7-12).

Its superintendent, Dr. Elizabeth Novack, was fired in December 2013 without public explanation.  The Board of Trustees appointed Michael Matsuda, the district's former BTSA Coordinator who also currently serves as Secretary on the North Orange County Community College District Board of Trustees.

The school district has gained brief national notoriety twice: once in 1968 when members of the organization Mothers Organized for Moral Stability, inspired by the information in the pamphlet "Is the School House the Proper Place to Teach Raw Sex?", flooded a school board meeting and demanded that a course in sex education at the school be suspended, and again in 1978 when it banned the novels Silas Marner and Gone with the Wind from the school curriculum.   The books and the course have long since been reinstated.

High schools

Anaheim High School (Established 1898), serves the Anaheim Colony District
Western High School (Established 1957), serves the western end of Anaheim, southwest Buena Park and northwest Stanton
Magnolia High School (Established 1961), serves the Southwest Anaheim region and northeast Stanton
Savanna High School (Established 1961), serves the Northwest Anaheim region and southeast Buena Park
Loara High School (Established 1962), serves the Anaheim Resort District
John F. Kennedy High School (Established 1964), serves La Palma and small portions of Cypress and Buena Park
Katella High School (Established 1966), serves the Southeast Anaheim region
Cypress High School (Established 1973), serves a majority of Cypress
Oxford Academy (Established 1998, 7th-12th grades)

Los Alamitos High School (Established 1967, was in the Anaheim Union High School District until 1980 when it left to become part of the new Los Alamitos Unified School District.

Junior high schools

Ball Junior High School (Established 1962)
Brookhurst Junior High School (Established 1956)
Dale Junior High School (Established 1959)
Lexington Junior High School (Established 1972)
Orangeview Junior High School (Established 1957)
South Junior High School (Established 1967
Sycamore Junior High School (Established 1961)
Walker Junior High School (Established 1959)

Pine Junior High School (Established 1968, now Christa McAuliffe Middle School) and Oak Junior High School (Established 1962, now Oak Middle School) were formerly in Anaheim Union High School District until 1980, but are now in the Los Alamitos Unified School District.

Other former junior high schools:

Apollo Junior High School (Established 1967, Closed in 1979, demolished)
Crescent Junior High School (Established 1961, Closed in 1979, demolished)
John C. Fremont Junior High School (Established 1912, Closed in 1979, demolished)
La Palma Junior High School (Established 1964, Closed in 1980. Now Hope School - AUHSD Special Needs)
Oxford Junior High School (Established 1965, Closed in 1980. Now Oxford Academy)
Trident Junior High School (Established 1960, Closed in 1980. Now Polaris High School - AUHSD independent study continuation high school)

Mascots
Anaheim High School - Colonists
Cypress High School - Centurions
Katella High School - Knights
John F. Kennedy High School - Fighting Irish
Loara High School - Saxons
Magnolia High School - Sentinels
Oxford Academy - Patriots (Oxford Junior High School, 1965-79: Wildcats) 
Savanna High School - Rebels
Western High School - Pioneers
Apollo Junior High School - Astros
Ball Junior High School - Blackhawks
Brookhurst Junior High School - Spartans
Crescent Junior High School - Crusaders
Dale Junior High School - Lancers
John C. Fremont Junior High School - Junior Colonists
Gilbert Junior High School - Gladiators
La Palma Junior High School - Patriots
Lexington Junior High School - Lions
Orangeview Junior High School - Panthers
South Junior High School - Eagles
Sycamore Junior High School - Buccaneers
Trident Junior High School - Dolphins
Walker Junior High School - Vikings

Feeder Districts
 Anaheim Elementary School District
 Buena Park School District
 Centralia School District
 Cypress School District
 Magnolia School District
 Savanna School District

References

External links

Official Anaheim Union High School District website

School districts in Orange County, California
Education in Anaheim, California
Buena Park, California
Cypress, California
School districts established in 1898
Stanton, California
1898 establishments in California